The National Basketball Association (NBA) is a major professional basketball league in North America. It was founded in 1946 as the Basketball Association of America (BAA). The league adopted its current name at the start of the  when it merged with the National Basketball League (NBL). The league consists of 30 teams, of which 29 are located in the United States and one in Canada.

In the NBA, a head coach is the highest ranking coach of a coaching staff. They typically hold a more public profile and are paid more than the assistant coaches. Lenny Wilkens has coached the most regular season games. He has coached 2,487 games with six teams in 32 seasons. Gregg Popovich has won the most regular season games with 1,344. Don Nelson, Bill Fitch, Jerry Sloan and Larry Brown are the only other coaches who have coached more than 2,000 regular season games. 33 other head coaches have coached more than 1,000 regular season games. Three of those coaches, Popovich, Al Attles and Erik Spoelstra, have spent their entire coaching career with one team. Popovich has coached 2,045 games with the San Antonio Spurs in his 26-year career, Attles has coached 1,075 games with the Warriors franchise in his 14-year career, and Spoelstra has coached 1,113 games with the Miami Heat. 

As of April 11, 2022, Popovich has the most regular season games coached (2,045) with one team, during his 26-year career with the San Antonio Spurs. He also has the record of most game wins when combining regular season and postseason games with 1,514 wins. Larry Brown has coached 9 different teams, the highest number of teams coached among the head coaches.

Former Chicago Bulls and Los Angeles Lakers head coach Phil Jackson won 11 NBA championships, the most in NBA history. He is the only coach who has won multiple championships with multiple teams. He won six titles with the Bulls and five titles with the Lakers. He also leads the NBA for the most postseason games coached and the most postseason wins. Red Auerbach won nine championships with the Boston Celtics. John Kundla, Pat Riley and current Spurs head coach Popovich have each won five championships. Popovich won all of his titles coaching the Spurs as Kundla won all of his titles with the Lakers, while Riley won four titles with the Lakers and one with the Miami Heat. Nelson, Popovich and Riley each won the Coach of the Year Award three times, while Fitch, Hubie Brown, Mike Budenholzer, Mike D'Antoni, Cotton Fitzsimmons, Gene Shue and Tom Thibodeau have each won it twice. 26 NBA head coaches (Rick Adelman, Red Auerbach, Larry Brown, John Calipari, Chuck Daly, Bill Fitch, Cotton Fitzsimmons, Alex Hannum, Tom Heinsohn, Red Holzman, Phil Jackson, Alvin Julian, John Kundla, Bobby Leonard, Ken Loeffler, Frank McGuire, Don Nelson, Rick Pitino, Jack Ramsay, Pat Riley, Bill Russell, Bill Sharman, Jerry Sloan, Jerry Tarkanian, Rudy Tomjanovich and Lenny Wilkens) have earned induction into the Naismith Memorial Basketball Hall of Fame as a coach. Auerbach, Daly, Fitch, Holzman, Jackson, Kundla, Nelson, Ramsay, Riley and Wilkens were named in the list of Top 10 Coaches in NBA History announced at the league's 50th anniversary in 1996. Larry Brown, Popovich, Sloan, Spoelstra, K. C. Jones, Steve Kerr, and Doc Rivers joined Auerbach, Daly, Holzman, Jackson, Nelson, Ramsay, Riley and Wilkens on the updated list of 15 Greatest Coaches in NBA History, announced during the league's 75th anniversary in 2021.

This list includes all head coaches who have coached at least 400 games in the NBA or BAA. The list does not include games in the American Basketball Association (ABA) for head coaches who coached in the ABA prior to the ABA–NBA merger.

Key

List
Note: Statistics are correct through February 26, 2023.

Notes

 Each year is linked to an article about that particular BAA/NBA season.
 Each year is linked to an article about the BAA/NBA Finals in that year.

References
General

Specific

See also
List of current National Basketball Association head coaches
List of National Basketball Association player-coaches
List of college men's basketball coaches with 600 wins

National Basketball Association lists